The NS 6100 was a series of tank engines with the 2'C2' (4-6-4) wheel arrangement of the Dutch Railways (NS). They were manufactured by Hohenzollern and Werkspoor.

History 
In the 1920s, the Dutch Railways invested heavily in the reinforcement of the railway track, as a result of which the maximum permitted axle load on most main lines could be increased from 16 to 18 tons. This created for the first time the possibility of designing a 2'C2' tank engine, which was completely derived from the 1910-originating four-cylinder series NS 3700. Until then, lighter two-cylinder locomotives of the series NS 6000 with a maximum axle load of 15.4 tons represented the limited possibility for a Dutch tank engine.

The first five locomotives were built by Hohenzollern in 1929 and five more were built by Werkspoor later that year.

Withdrawal and scrapping 
No. 6103 also belonged to the first nineteen locomotives that had to be scrapped after the liberation as a result of war damage. On September 29, 1945, permission was obtained to scrap this heavily damaged locomotive, among other things. According to information from Mr. Van Wijck Jurriaanse, the scrapping (without boiler) took place in April 1946 on the site of the Wpc Tilburg, but given the inconvenient condition of 6103, it seems more likely that the locomotive has come to its final end in Arnhem. The second 6100 to be scrapped was locomotive 6109, which had returned from Barsinghausen, Germany, damaged.

In 1956 the systematic withdrawal of the remaining seven 6100s was initiated. First up were Nos. 6101 (March) and 6106 (May), of which No. 6106 was allocated to the Zutphen depot from 19 May to 30 September 1956 as a stationary boiler. During 1957 Nos. 6104 (February), 6107 and 6110 (both August) were withdrawn and put aside for scrap, and in February 1958 the last Tenderjumbos 6102 and 6108 were also withdrawn from service.

Gallery

Sources and references 

 Paul Henken: Stoomlocomotieven NS-serie 6100. De geschiedenis van de Tenderjumbo's. Uquilair, Rosmalen, 2002. ISBN 90 71513 43 2
 H. Waldorp: Onze Nederlandse stoomlocomotieven in woord en beeld, (7e druk) uitgeverij De Alk, Alkmaar, 1986. ISBN 90-6013-947-X
 N. J. van Wijck Jurriaanse: Stoomlocomotieven van de nederlandse spoorwegen Uitg. Wyt, Rotterdam, 1972. ISBN 90-6007-517-X
 H. van Poll: Stoomtractie bij de Nederlandse Spoorwegen 1944~1958. Uitgeverij de Bataafsche Leeuw B.V. ISBN 90-6707-003-3 
 A. Weijts: Tussen vuur en stoom. Uitg. Europese Bibliotheek, Zaltbommel, 2001. ISBN 90-288-26947 

4-6-4T locomotives
Steam locomotives of the Netherlands
Werkspoor locomotives
Hohenzollern locomotives
Rolling stock of the Netherlands